For Love and Crown is a 1922 German silent film directed by Franz Osten.

Cast
In alphabetical order

References

Bibliography

External links

1922 films
Films of the Weimar Republic
Films directed by Franz Osten
German silent feature films
German black-and-white films